NLGN may refer to:

Neuroligin, a protein
New Local Government Network, a think tank of the United Kingdom